Brno Ossuary is an underground ossuary in Brno, Czech Republic. It was rediscovered in 2001 in the historical centre of the city, partially under the Church of St. James. It is estimated that the ossuary holds the remains of over 50 thousand people which makes it the second-largest ossuary in Europe, after the Catacombs of Paris. The ossuary was founded in the 17th century, and was expanded in the 18th century. It's been opened to public since June 2012.

References

External links
 Official website
 

17th-century establishments in Bohemia
Cemeteries in Brno
Tourist attractions in Brno
Ossuaries